Persicaria lanigera is a species of plants in the family Polygonaceae.

Sources

References 

lanigera